The 2016 West Michigan Ironmen season was the franchise's inaugural season and the city of Muskegon's first indoor football season since the West Michigan ThunderHawks folded following the 2009 season.

The Ironmen won their first-ever season game against the Northern Kentucky 65–27 on March 20. Head coach Tyrese Lynk led the Ironmen to a 6–1 record and birth in the 2016 AIF Championship Game where they lost 32–74 to the Columbus Lions.

Coaching staff

Schedule
Key:

Preseason
All start times are local to home team

Regular season
All start times are local to home team

Standings

Playoffs
All start times are local to home team

* — When initially announced, the Ironmen were set to play the Northern Division's fourth-seeded Central Penn Capitals. On May 30, the Capitals were replaced with the Southern Division's third-seeded Myrtle Beach Freedom.

Roster

References

2016 American Indoor Football season
2016 in sports in Michigan
West Michigan Ironmen